Prometheus Bound and the Oceanids (German:Prometheus, beklagt von den Okeaniden) is an 1879 marble sculpture by German sculptor Eduard Müller, located at Alte Nationalgalerie in Berlin, Germany. Its subject is from the play Prometheus Bound, traditionally attributed to Aeschylus.

References

External links

 

1879 establishments in Germany
1879 sculptures
Marble sculptures in Germany
Nude sculptures in Germany
Sculptures of classical mythology
Sculptures of men in Germany
Sculptures of women in Germany
Statues in Germany
Works based on Prometheus Bound